Mickey Burke (died 25 February 1993) is an Irish former footballer who played as a right full.

Born in Dublin, the son of John Burke (footballer), Burke joined Shamrock Rovers in 1951 from Johnville with Gerry Mackey and was part of the team popularly known as Coad's Colts that enjoyed many memorable days during the 1950s.

He played in Rovers' two games against Manchester United in the European Champion Clubs' Cup in 1957. A schoolboy international he was also played twelve times for the League of Ireland XI while at Glenmalure Park.

Burke signed for Drumcondra F.C. in 1959 but moved to New York City soon after and was there to cheer on the Hoops when they toured in 1961.

His aunt was Mrs Cunningham who was Rovers influential director in his playing days.

Honours
Shamrock Rovers 
League of Ireland 3:
 1953/54, 1956/57, 1958/59
FAI Cup 2: 2
 1955, 1956
League of Ireland Shield 5:
 1951/52, 1954/55, 1955/56, 1956/57, 1957/58
Leinster Senior Cup 4:
 1955, 1956, 1957, 1958
Dublin City Cup 4:
 1952/53, 1954/55, 1956/57, 1957/58
LFA President's Cup 1 :
 1954/55

Sources
 The Hoops by Paul Doolan and Robert Goggins

References

Association footballers from Dublin (city)
Republic of Ireland association footballers
Shamrock Rovers F.C. players
Drumcondra F.C. players
League of Ireland players
League of Ireland XI players
1993 deaths
Year of birth missing
Association footballers not categorized by position